Ohariu (or Ohariu Valley) is a suburb of Wellington, New Zealand.

The name is a corruption of Owhariu, where, according to Māori mythology, Kupe dried the sails of his canoe. The area is governed by the Mākara / Ōhāriu Community Board.

History 
In the 19th century, Ohariu was divided into Country Sections by the New Zealand Company. Many were sold to absentee owners, and there were only three resident settlers in 1854: James Smith, James Hallett and James Holder. Later settlers from the 1860s were James Bryant and his sons of Huia Farm, Thomas Bassett of Willow Bank, Charles Austin, George Best, and George Beech. Initially farms ran sheep and beef cattle.

Access was by tracks from Awarua Street (Ngaio), Khandallah and Johnsonville; from the 1860s by the Old Coach Road, and in 1908 via Ironside Road to Johnsonville.

From 1916 there was a dairying invasion which lasted fifty years, because of a better return than from sheep. It began when Frank Nossiter bought Alf Kirby's 100 acre (41 ha) sheep farm, and moved 25 cows from Fielding to his Catewell Farm. He was joined by a dozen more dairy farmers.

Ohariu Valley has an article from 1896 in The Cyclopedia of New Zealand.

Demographics

Mākara-Ohariu had a population of 951 at the 2018 New Zealand census, an increase of 99 people (11.6%) since the 2013 census, and an increase of 183 people (23.8%) since the 2006 census. There were 321 households. There were 477 males and 474 females, giving a sex ratio of 1.01 males per female. The median age was 42.7 years (compared with 37.4 years nationally), with 159 people (16.7%) aged under 15 years, 177 (18.6%) aged 15 to 29, 504 (53.0%) aged 30 to 64, and 108 (11.4%) aged 65 or older.

Ethnicities were 92.1% European/Pākehā, 10.1% Māori, 1.9% Pacific peoples, 3.2% Asian, and 2.2% other ethnicities (totals add to more than 100% since people could identify with multiple ethnicities).

The proportion of people born overseas was 20.8%, compared with 27.1% nationally.

Although some people objected to giving their religion, 56.5% had no religion, 31.5% were Christian, 0.3% were Hindu, 0.6% were Buddhist and 2.5% had other religions.

Of those at least 15 years old, 255 (32.2%) people had a bachelor or higher degree, and 84 (10.6%) people had no formal qualifications. The median income was $47,700, compared with $31,800 nationally. The employment status of those at least 15 was that 474 (59.8%) people were employed full-time, 141 (17.8%) were part-time, and 21 (2.7%) were unemployed.

Further reading

References

External links 
Ohariu Valley History & Oral History Project (Library website)

Suburbs of Wellington City